Heart of the West is a 1936 American Western film directed by Howard Bretherton and written by Doris Schroeder. The film stars William Boyd, James Ellison, George "Gabby" Hayes, Sidney Blackmer, Lynn Gabriel, Fred Kohler and Warner Richmond. The film was released on July 24, 1936, by Paramount Pictures.

Plot

Cast  
 William Boyd as Hopalong Cassidy
 James Ellison as Johnny Nelson 
 George "Gabby" Hayes as Windy Halliday 
 Sidney Blackmer as John Trumbull
 Lynn Gabriel as Sally Jordan
 Fred Kohler as Barton
 Warner Richmond as Henchman Johnson
 Jack Rutherford as Henchman Tom Paterson 
 Walter Miller as Henchman Whitey
 Charles Martin as Jim Jordan
 Ted Adams as Henchman Saxon
 Robert McKenzie as Tim Grady

References

External links 
 
 
 
 

1936 films
American Western (genre) films
1936 Western (genre) films
Paramount Pictures films
Films directed by Howard Bretherton
Hopalong Cassidy films
American black-and-white films
1930s English-language films
1930s American films